UTV may refer to:

Motorsport
 UTV, utility vehicle
 Side by Side (UTV), small off-road vehicle

Broadcasting
 UTV (TV channel) (formerly Ulster Television), TV channel in Northern Ireland owned by ITV plc
 UTV Live, news service
 UTV Ireland, now Virgin Media Three, TV channel owned by Virgin Media Television
 UTV Media, now Wireless Group, broadcasting and New Media company based in Belfast, Northern Ireland
 UTV Software Communications, diversified media conglomerate in India
 UTV Motion Pictures
 UTV News (Albania), Albanian news channel
 Uganda Television, merged into Uganda Broadcasting Corporation in 2004
 UTV Romania
 Ürümqi Television Station (UTV), local television station in Ürümqi, Xinjiang, China
 U.TV, former branding of CKVU-TV
 Universal Television, TV production subsidiary of NBCUniversal Television Group & TV production arm of NBC

Other
 UltimateTV (online service), former website about television-related matters